The Sac County Courthouse  in Sac City, Iowa, United States, was built in 1889. It was listed on the National Register of Historic Places in 1981 as a part of the County Courthouses in Iowa Thematic Resource. The courthouse is the third building the county has used for court functions and county administration.

History
The first Sac County courthouse was a two-story brick building that was constructed in 1860. The building measured . The courtroom was on the second floor with the county offices on the first floor. The second courthouse, which was built in 1873, measured . It too was built of brick, and was destroyed by an arsonist in 1888.

The present courthouse was built in 1889. Storm Lake, Iowa architect J.M. Russell designed the building that is basically a form of vernacular architecture with a reference to the Romanesque in the entrances arches. It was very similar in design to the courthouse that had just been completed in Storm Lake (no longer extant). The county used $15,000 in insurance money and the same amount raised by county citizens to build the courthouse. The building was renovated in 1900. A courtroom addition was built onto the east side of the building in 1977. The architect for the project was Keninger, Galvin & Associates and the contractor was McCorkle Construction Company.

Architecture
The courthouse is a two-story structure composed of red brick. A center pavilion projects slightly from the main building. It has a stone arch with large voussoirs that used to be the main entrance. Stone trim runs in horizontal bands and around the windows. The gable ends feature shoulder parapets. The base of the building is coarse stone and it is capped with a hipped roof. The significance of the courthouse is derived from its association with county government, and the political power and prestige of Sac City as the county seat.

References

Government buildings completed in 1889
Sac City, Iowa
Vernacular architecture in Iowa
Romanesque Revival architecture in Iowa
Buildings and structures in Sac County, Iowa
Courthouses on the National Register of Historic Places in Iowa
County courthouses in Iowa
National Register of Historic Places in Sac County, Iowa